Tanja Kostić (born November 10, 1972) is a Swedish retired women's basketball player best known for playing with the Oregon State Beavers from 1993 to 1996. She won a EuroLeague Women in 1998 with CJM Bourges Basket.

Early life
Kostic was born in Solna, Sweden, and was a member of the Swedish national team by age 19. She enrolled at Oregon State University (OSU) in the United States in 1992. Throughout her career at OSU, she recorded school records of 2,349 points scored and 1,001 rebounds in 111 career games. She is the only player in school history with 2,000 points and 1,000 rebounds. Kostić made 869 field goals, and set Oregon State and Pac-10 records for free throws attempted (903), free throws made (608), and set an OSU record for field goals attempted with 1,773. She is the second all-time leading career scorer in the Pac-10, and the sixth all-time leading career rebounder in the Pac-10.

Honours
Kostić was a first-team All-Pac-10 team member all four years at Oregon State, making the All-Freshman Pac-10 first team in 1993. She was a consensus All-American in 1996 on the second team, and was Pac-10 Player of the Year in both 1995 and 1996.

Professional career
Kostić played for the Portland Power of the American Basketball League, as well as the Cleveland Rockers and Miami Sol of the Women's National Basketball Association. She played five games for the Rockers in 1998 and five games for the Sol in 2000.

Personal life
Her parents are Serbian. She is married to Lithuanian basketball star Rimantas Kaukėnas, with whom she has three daughters.

See also 
 List of Serbian WNBA players

References

1972 births
Living people
All-American college women's basketball players
Cleveland Rockers players
Miami Sol players
Oregon State Beavers women's basketball players
Portland Power players
Power forwards (basketball)
Serb diaspora sportspeople
Swedish expatriate basketball people in the United States
Swedish people of Serbian descent
Swedish women's basketball players
People from Solna Municipality
Sportspeople from Stockholm County